Stewart Vernon Laudat (born 25 February 1971) is an English cricketer. Laudat is a right-handed batsman who bowls right-arm medium pace. He was born in Oxford, Oxfordshire.

Laudat made his debut for Oxfordshire in the 1990 Minor Counties Championship against Wiltshire. Laudat played Minor counties cricket for Oxfordshire from 1990 to 2006, which included 48 Minor Counties Championship matches and 28 MCCA Knockout Trophy matches. He made his List A debut against Surrey in the 1991 NatWest Trophy. He played 8 further List A matches for Oxfordshire, the last coming against Huntingdonshire in the 2001 Cheltenham & Gloucester Trophy. In his 8 List A matches for Oxfordshire, he scored 229 runs at a batting average of 28.62, with a high score of 58. His highest score came against the Durham Cricket Board in the 1999 NatWest Trophy. With the ball he took 6 wickets at a bowling average of 56.00, with best figures of 2/15.

Playing for Oxfordshire entitled him to also play for the Minor Counties cricket team. He made his debut for the team in the 1996 Benson & Hedges Cup against Leicestershire. He played 6 further List A matches for the team, the last coming against Yorkshire in the 1997 Benson & Hedges Cup. In his 7 matches for the team, he scored 95 runs at an average of 15.83, with a high score of 43*. With the ball the took 5 wickets at an average of 61.60, with best figures of 2/40. Overall, Laudat played 17 List A matches in his career. In these he scored a total of 324 runs at an average of 23.14, with 2 half centuries and a high score of 58. With the ball, he took 11 wickets at an average of 58.54, with best figures of 2/15.

He has previously played for the Northamptonshire Second XI in 1992.

References

External links
Stewart Laudat at ESPNcricinfo
Stewart Laudat at CricketArchive

1971 births
Living people
Cricketers from Oxford
English cricketers
Oxfordshire cricketers
Minor Counties cricketers